The Conference of Consulting Actuaries (CCA) is a professional society of actuaries engaged in consulting in the United States and Canada, as opposed to those employed by insurance companies. CCA members assist their clients with respect to pension, health, and other employee benefit plans; life insurance; and property and casualty insurance.

Mission 
The CCA's mission is to advance the quality of consulting practice, support the needs of consulting actuaries, and represent their interests. Some of the ways in which it does so include:

 Developing and maintaining structure and programs to reinforce, enhance, or add to members' knowledge and skills; including continuing education, through diverse delivery methods, for all practice areas and for consulting and business skills.
 Investing resources strategically to support services and educational opportunities for consulting actuaries.
 Representing consulting actuaries throughout the global community.

History 
The CCA was founded in 1950 as the Conference of Actuaries in Public Practice by seven actuaries who felt the need for a professional association to set standards and share information among consulting actuaries. At the time, the major American actuarial organizations — the Society of Actuaries and the Casualty Actuarial Society — were dominated by actuaries who worked for insurance companies.

In October 1991, the Conference changed its name to the Conference of Consulting Actuaries.

Membership 
The CCA offers two designations, Associate of the Conference of Consulting Actuaries (ACA) and Fellow of the Conference of Consulting Actuaries (FCA).

Associate Has attained the designation of Associate of the Casualty Actuarial Society (ACAS), Associate of the Society of Actuaries (ASA), Enrolled Actuary (EA), Member of the American Academy of Actuaries (MAAA), Member of the American Society of Pension Professionals and Actuaries (MSPA), or the equivalent designation for any international actuarial organization accepted by the Conference.

Fellow Is substantially engaged in consulting actuarial practice, in work as an actuary of a governmental unit, in work as an Enrolled Actuary, in work at an insurance company, or in teaching actuarial science; and satisfies any one of the following three criteria:

Has completed six years of experience in responsible actuarial work, three of which are in actuarial consulting, and satisfied the requirements to become an Associate of the Conference.

Has been an Associate of the Conference (ACA) for three consecutive years and is practicing as a consultant; or

Has attained the designation of Fellow of the Casualty Actuarial Society (FCAS), Fellow of the Society of Actuaries (FSA), Fellow of the American Society of Pension Professionals and Actuaries (FSPA), or the equivalent designation for any international actuarial organization accepted by the Conference.

As of March 2007, more than 1,200 actuaries belonged to the CCA.

Continuing professional education 
Many consulting actuaries attend continuing education meetings sponsored by the CCA. Its three major annual meetings are the Enrolled Actuaries Conference, the Healthcare Meeting, and the CCA's Annual Meeting.

In addition to those meetings, the CCA also sponsors or co-sponsors a variety of seminars and teleconferences. In contrast to its annual meetings, which offer sessions on variety of subjects, the CCA's seminars and teleconferences generally are limited to a single topic of current interest.

References

External links
 Home page of the Conference of Consulting Actuaries

Actuarial associations
Organizations established in 1950
Professional associations based in the United States